Sole meunière (or sole à la meunière) is a classic French fish dish consisting of sole, preferably whole (gray skin removed) or filet, that is dredged in flour, pan fried in butter and served with the resulting brown butter sauce, parsley and lemon. When cooked, sole meunière has a light but moist texture and a mild flavor. Since sole is a flatfish, a single fish will yield four filets rather than the two filets that a roundfish will produce. When preparing sole meunière, a true Dover sole is preferred.  In classic service, the whole sole is first sautéed in butter. Then, when cooking is finished, the fish is boned and plated by the waiter tableside.

Sole meunière was the first meal Julia Child ate upon her arrival in France and has been credited as inspiring the chef, who called it "the most exciting meal of my life" in her memoir, My Life in France.

See also
Meunière sauce

References

Fish dishes
French cuisine

ja:ムニエル